The 2018–19 KBL season was the 23rd season of the Korean Basketball League (KBL), the highest level of basketball in South Korea. The regular season began play on 13 October 2018. Ulsan Hyundai Mobis Phoebus won its seventh KBL championship.

Regular season

Playoffs

Individual awards

Yearly awards
Most Valuable Player: Lee Jung-hyun (Jeonju KCC Egis)
Foreign Player of the Year: Ra Gun-ah (Ulsan Hyundai Mobis Phoebus)
Coach of the Year: Yoo Jae-hak (Ulsan Hyundai Mobis Phoebus)
Rookie of the Year: Byeon Jun-hyung (Anyang KGC)
KBL Best 5
Lee Jung-hyun (Jeonju KCC Egis)
Park Chan-hee (Incheon Electroland Elephants
Yang Hong-seok (Busan KT Sonicboom)
Ham Ji-hoon (Ulsan Hyundai Mobis Phoebus)
Ra Gun-ah (Ulsan Hyundai Mobis Phoebus)
Sixth Man Award: Kim Nak-hyeon (Incheon Electroland Elephants)
Skill Development Award: Yang Hong-seok (Busan KT Sonicboom)
Defensive Best 5
Park Chan-hee (Incheon Electroland Elephants)
Choi Won-hyuk (Seoul SK Knights)
Yang Hee-jong (Anyang KGC)
Yun Ho-young (Wonju DB Promy)
Ra Gun-ah (Ulsan Hyundai Mobis Phoebus)
Defensive Player of the Year: Park Chan-hee (Incheon Electroland Elephants)
Fair Play Award: Yang Dong-geun (Ulsan Hyundai Mobis Phoebus)

Individual statistic leaders

Round MVP
The following players were named MVP of the Round:
Round 1: Ra Gun-ah (Ulsan Hyundai Mobis Phoebus)
Round 2: Yang Hong-seok (Busan KT Sonicboom)
Round 3: Lee Jung-hyun (Jeonju KCC Egis
Round 4: Park Chan-hee (Incheon Electroland Elephants)
Round 5: Giddy Potts (Incheon Electroland Elephants)
Round 6: Lee Dae-sung (Ulsan Hyundai Mobis Phoebus)

Records
 On 29 January 2019, Yang Hong-seok became the youngest player in KBL history to record a triple-double at age 21 years and 6 months. Joo Hee-jung previously held the record, achieving it at age 23 years.

Notes

References

2018-19
2018–19 in South Korean basketball
2018–19 in Asian basketball leagues